Martwain Johnston (born February 28, 1986) is an American rugby league footballer who plays for the Delaware Black Foxes. He was selected to represent the USA in the 2017 Rugby League World Cup.

Early years
From Syracuse, New York. He attended George Fowler High School where he ran track and played football.

He played American football at the University of Delaware as a wide receiver.

He works for the US Postal Service.

Playing career
He played for the Philadelphia Fight in their premiership win 28-26 over New Haven Warriors in 2011. He scored a try for the USA in their 36-18 victory over Canada in October 2017.

References

External links
Delaware Black Foxes profiles
ESPN Stats
2017 RLWC profile

1986 births
Living people
American football wide receivers
American rugby league players
Delaware Black Foxes players
Delaware Fightin' Blue Hens football players
Footballers who switched code
Philadelphia Fight players
Players of American football from New York (state)
Rugby league wingers
Sportspeople from Syracuse, New York
Johnston
United States Postal Service people